Jonathan Dunham (January 17, 1640 – September 6, 1724), known in his early life as Jonathan Singletary, was a prominent early European-American settler of Woodbridge Township, New Jersey, who built the first gristmill in New Jersey. He was an ancestor of President Barack Obama.

Life

Jonathan Singletary, later Dunham, was born on January 17, 1639/40, in Salisbury, Massachusetts, the son of Richard Singletary and Susanna Cooke. He married Mary Bloomfield (a relative of the later New Jersey Governor Joseph Bloomfield, for whom the township of Bloomfield, New Jersey is named).

He and his wife migrated to Woodbridge Township, New Jersey, the first Township of New Jersey, which was chartered by King Charles II on June 1, 1669. Possibly due to an unsubstantiated family legend about his father being the heir of the family of Dunham, or because Jonathan himself was the son of an earlier marriage of Richard Singletary to a Dunham wife who had died in 1638/39, Jonathan Singletary called himself Dunham after moving to New Jersey. While all of the other sons of Richard Singletary used the Singletary surname, Jonathan adopted the name of Dunham, and all of his children retained it.

At Woodbridge, Dunham was granted  of land by the newly appointed Governor of New Jersey. Upon this land, he built the first gristmill in New Jersey. After finding success with his gristmill, Dunham went into public life, serving as the Clerk of the Woodbridge Township Court and overseer of highways, and in 1673 he was elected to the New Jersey Provincial Congress.

Death and legacy
Dunham died in Woodbridge, New Jersey in 1724. The house the Dunhams built in 1671, the Jonathan Singletary Dunham House, still stands and currently serves as the Rectory of the Trinity Episcopal Church.

In the words of Woodridge historian Rev. Joseph W. Dally, "Dunham was a man of great energy. When he determined upon an enterprise he pushed it forward to success with indomitable perseverance. So many of his relatives settled in the north of the Kirk Green that the neighborhood was known as Dunhamtown for many years."

In addition to one of the original millstones used by Dunham, two memorial plaques have been placed in front of the Trinity Church Rectory. The first plaque reads, "This millstone from the mill of Jonathan Dunham builder of Trinity Church Rectory 1670 was placed here by Trinity Young Peoples Fellowship on the 250th Anniversary of Trinity Church May 16, 1948." The second memorial plaque reads, "In Memory of Jonathan Dunham who in 1670 established the First Grist Mill in New Jersey at Woodbridge, New Jersey and built the Brick House now Trinity Church Rector dedicated October 5, 1969 by the 300th Anniversary Comm. of Woodbridge Township NJ."

Notable descendants
Perry Donham (1960–), Computer Science Professor at Boston University
Stanley Armour Dunham (1918–1992), maternal grandfather of Barack Obama
Ann Dunham (1942–1995), American anthropologist and mother of Barack Obama
Barack Obama (1961–), 44th President of the United States
Malia and Sasha Obama (born 1998 / 2001)
Joseph Bloomfield (1753–1823), 4th Governor of New Jersey

References

1640 births
1724 deaths
People from Woodbridge Township, New Jersey
People from Newbury, Massachusetts
Plymouth Colony
Plymouth, Massachusetts
People of colonial New Jersey
People of colonial Massachusetts
Obama family